Great How or Great Howe is a hill of  in the north west of the Lake District, England, lying south of Scafell Pike and east of Burnmoor Tarn. It lies in the Borough of Copeland in Cumbria.

It is classed as a Fellranger, being described by Richards in the Wasdale volume of his book series.  It is among the 21 such summits (originally 18 before the extension of the Lake District) which are not included in Wainwright's list of 214. It is also classed as a Dodd, Dewey, Birkett and Synge.

References

Fells of the Lake District
Borough of Copeland